Lightnin' Shot is a 1928 American silent Western film directed by J.P. McGowan and starring Buddy Roosevelt.

Cast
 Buddy Roosevelt
 J.P. McGowan
 Frank Earle
 Carol Lane
 Jimmy Kane
 Tommy Bay
 Art Rowlands

References

External links
 

1928 films
1928 Western (genre) films
Films directed by J. P. McGowan
American black-and-white films
Rayart Pictures films
Silent American Western (genre) films
1920s English-language films
1920s American films